For the mercenary group of the same name in the First Congo War (1996-1997), see White Legion (Zaire).

The White Legion (t'et'ri legioni) was a guerrilla group consisting mostly of ethnic Georgians who remained in Abkhazia after the Georgian regular army's defeat in the War in Abkhazia (1992–1993).

The group, along with another guerrilla group called the Forest Brothers, continued low-intensity guerrilla war against Abkhaz forces along the ceasefire line in the late 1990s and early 2000s.

The White Legion was led by Zurab Samushia.

References

Guerrilla organizations
Military units and formations of Georgia (country)